Central High School, or CHS, is a public four-year high school located at 14075 Ken Austin Parkway in Brooksville, Florida, United States, a city north of Tampa. The school currently has 1,610 students enrolled as of 2013.

Honors
In 2006 and 2010 Central High's NJROTC was honored by being The Most Outstanding Unit in the Nation. In 2005, 2008, 2009, and 2011 it was honored as the 2nd Most Outstanding Unit in the Nation by the Navy League of the United States.

Notable people
DuJuan Harris, American football running back

References

External links 
http://www.navyleague.org
http://www.centralnjrotc.net

High schools in Hernando County, Florida
Public high schools in Florida